Le Grand High School is a public high school located in Le Grand, California.

Statistics 
In the 2016–17 school year, the school had a total of 463 students.

References 

Educational institutions established in 1909
Public high schools in California
High schools in Merced County, California
1909 establishments in California